This is a list of wars involving the Republic of Cyprus and its predecessor states.

Other armed conflicts involving Cyprus
Ionian Revolt 499-493 BC
Raid on Larnaca Airport 1978

References

 
Wars
Cyprus
Wars
Wars